Survive is the ninth studio album by Japanese rock duo B'z, released November 19, 1997. The album sold 1,040,160 copies in its first week, lower than their last studio album, the album still managed to sell over 1,723,030 copies.

Track listing 
 Deep Kiss - 4:14
  - 3:18
 Survive - 4:48
 Liar! Liar! - 3:22
 Hapinesu (Happiness) (ハピネス) - 4:51
 Fireball - 4:15
 Do Me - 3:28
 Naite Naite Nakiyandara (泣いて泣いて 泣きやんだら) - 3:37
 Cat - 3:42
 Dattara Agechaeyo (だったらあげちゃえよ) - 3:51
 Shower - 4:37
 Calling - 5:56

Certifications

References 
 B'z albums at the official site

1997 albums
B'z albums
Japanese-language albums